Reh or REH may refer to:

People
 Alina Reh (born 1997), German long-distance runner
 Claudia Reh (born 1970), German light artist
 Emma Reh (1896–1982), American journalist 
 Francis Frederick Reh (1911–1994), American Catholic bishop 
 Reh Jones (born 1984), American YouTube personality 
 Robert E. Howard (1906–1936), pulp fiction author 
 Spiron Reh (born 2004), American Chick-fil-A worker
 Thomas Reh, American biochemist
 Virginia Reh, American actress and theatre director

Other uses
 Rare Earth hypothesis that extraterrestrial life rarely happens
 Royal Edinburgh Hospital, Scotland
 Reh Inscription, a Brahmi inscription at the Reh archaeological site, Uttar Pradesh, India

Surnames from nicknames